Rhodopina tokarensis is a species of beetle in the family Cerambycidae. It was described by Masao Hayashi in 1956.

Subspecies
 Rhodopina tokarensis tokarensis Hayashi, 1956
 Rhodopina tokarensis komiyai Hayashi, 1969
 Rhodopina tokarensis orientalis Yokoyama, 1971
 Rhodopina tokarensis obscura Makihara, 1977

References

tokarensis
Beetles described in 1956